Claude Baux (born 27 August 1945) is a French retired slalom canoeist who competed in the 1960s and 1970s. He won a bronze medal in the C-1 team event at the 1969 ICF Canoe Slalom World Championships in Bourg St.-Maurice. Baux also finished 15th in the C-1 event at the 1972 Summer Olympics in Munich.

References
Sports-reference.com profile

1945 births
Canoeists at the 1972 Summer Olympics
French male canoeists
Living people
Olympic canoeists of France
Place of birth missing (living people)
Medalists at the ICF Canoe Slalom World Championships